Robbi Sapinggi (20 September 1984 – 5 June 2015) was one of four Malaysian mountain guides who died on Mount Kinabalu during the 2015 Sabah earthquake which claimed the lives of at least 18 people, mostly pupils and teachers from Tanjong Katong Primary School in Singapore, and injured 10 others. The quake struck at about 7:15am (MST) at Ranau, Sabah, Malaysia. Robbi gained notability in the media when he died in an apparent attempt to save a tourist climber from falling rocks. He has been portrayed and praised as a hero for his act of bravery and sacrifice. His body was found by emergency rescuers at about 4:00pm local time near Laban Rata about 20 m from where it was believed he was hit by hurtling rocks during the earthquake. 

Many other mountaineers who had come across the guide over the years have described him as selfless, compassionate, sacrificial, fun-loving, energetic, enthusiastic and a dedicated mountain guide who put the interest of others before his. Tourists who have visited Mount Kinabalu have recounted his various sacrifices to ensure their safety and comfort while climbing the mountain. Cath Jayasuriya, executive director of Coalition Duchenne that brings together organisations around the world in attempts to raise global awareness on Duchenne muscular dystrophy said:

Robbi was buried on 7 June 2015 at his village of Kiau in Kota Belud at about 2:30pm. He is survived by a six-month-old son and his wife, Reena Joshi, whom he married in September 2014.

References

External links
 Robbi Sapinggi's Photo Taken On Mount Kinabalu Summit Right Before The Earthquake Happened
 Robbi Sapinggi screenshot from “Dusty’s Trail: Summit of Borneo” Kiau, 2013: A Film by Catherine Jayasuriya. Screen shot courtesy of Cath Jayasuriya

1984 births
2015 deaths
Kadazan-Dusun people
People from Sabah
Mountain guides
Natural disaster deaths in Malaysia
Deaths in earthquakes
People from Kota Belud District